"Country Girls" is a song written by Troy Seals and Eddie Setser, and recorded by actor and American country music artist John Schneider.  It was released in December 1984 as the second single from the album Too Good to Stop Now.  The song was Schneider's second number one on the country chart.  The single went to number one for one week, and spent a total of fourteen weeks on the country chart.

Charts

Weekly charts

Year-end charts

References

1985 singles
1984 songs
John Schneider (screen actor) songs
Song recordings produced by Jimmy Bowen
Songs written by Troy Seals
Songs about Chicago
MCA Records singles
Songs written by Eddie Setser